Avingak Creek is a stream in North Slope Borough, Alaska, in the United States. It is a tributary of the Kokolik River.

Avingak is derived from the Eskimo word meaning "lemming", and the abundance of lemmings at the creek caused its name to be selected.

See also
 List of rivers of Alaska

References

Rivers of North Slope Borough, Alaska
Rivers of Alaska